The Ministry of Justice is a department of the Albanian Government, responsible for the implementation of government justice policy, the Albanian legal system in the Constitution and general administrative law, civil law, procedural law and criminal law as well as matters relating to democratic issues, human rights, integration and minority issues and metropolitan affairs.

The current Minister of Justice is Ulsi Manja since 2 September 2021.

History
The Ministry of Justice was one of the original ministries created following the Independence of Albania in 1912.

From 1968 to 1989, the ministry was closed. It reopened as part of a series of reforms during the fall of communism in Albania.

Reorganization
Since the establishment of the institution, the Ministry of Justice has undergone several administrative changes to its organizational structure. When a new department was formed, it often merged with the ministry thus expanding its role, subsequently leading to the name of the ministry being changed. If that department later broke off as a separate ministry or was dissolved, the ministry reverted to its original name.

 Ministry of Justice (1912–1914)
 Ministry of Justice and Cults (1914)
 Ministry of Justice (1914–1925)
 Ministry of Finances and Justice (1925)
 Ministry of Justice (1925–1939)
 Minister State Secretary of Justice (1939–1943)
 Ministry of Justice (1943–present)

Subordinate institutions
 Bankruptcy Oversight Agency
 Property Handling Agency
 State Advocacy
 General Directorate of Prisons
 General Enforcement Directorate
 Institute of Forensic Medicine
 Albanian Adoption Committee
 Center of Official Publications
 Probation Service
 Central Office for the Registration of Immovable Property
 State Aid Justice Commission

Officeholders (1912–present)

See also
 Judiciary of Albania

Notes

References

Justice
Albania
Albania
1912 establishments in Albania